Parkhill/Stanley Park is a residential neighbourhood in the southwest quadrant of Calgary, Alberta. It is bounded by Mission Road to the north, Macleod Trail to the east, Crescent Boulevard to the south and the Elbow River to the west. The Roxboro Park borders the community to the north and Stanley Park is established in the Elbow River valley.

This is one of Calgary's oldest neighbourhoods, being established in 1910. It is represented in the Calgary City Council by the Ward 9 councillor. The community has an area redevelopment plan in place.

Demographics

Residents in this community had a median household income of $60,937 in 2000, and there were 13.6% low income residents living in the neighbourhood. As of 2000, 14.7% of the residents were immigrants. A proportion of 32.8% of the buildings were condominiums or apartments, and 43.1% of the housing was used for renting.

See also
List of neighbourhoods in Calgary

References

External links
Parkhill-Stanley Park Community Association

Neighbourhoods in Calgary